The Eldred Rock Light is an historic octagonal lighthouse adjacent to Lynn Canal in Alaska. It is the last of the ten lighthouses constructed in Alaska between 1902 and 1906.  It was also the last of 12 manned lighthouses that were started in Alaska.  It is listed on the National Register of Historic Places as Eldred Rock Lighthouse.

History
The Lighthouse Board approved plans for a lighthouse on Eldred Rock in 1905 and hoped that the design would be completed before November and the coming of harsh winter weather. However, due to weather, the lighthouse was not finished until June 1, 1906. A fourth-order Fresnel lens was placed in the lantern room, near the top of the fifty-six foot lighthouse, at a focal plane of ninety-one feet. This unique lens consisted of two bull's-eye panels — one about four feet in diameter and the opposing one a smaller, 14-inch panel. A sheet of red glass was placed between the light source and the larger prism, causing the revolving lens to produce alternating red and white flashes. The light was automated by the United States Coast Guard in 1973 and downgraded to a minor light. 

In view of Skagway's commercial importance, the United States Board of Light-Houses established four manned lighthouses in Lynn Canal between the years 1902 and 1906. This was nearly half the number of light stations ever located in Southeast Alaska
in the 1900s. Commissioned in 1906, Eldred Rock Light Station was the last lighthouse constructed in Lynn Canal; the second station in Alaska with light and fog-signal apparatus and keepers' quarters combined in a single structure; and the first lighthouse in Alaska constructed with concrete.

Nils Peter Adamson was a keeper on Eldred Rock in 1910, when his colleagues (John Currie and John Silander) disappeared during their way with victuals from lighthouse Point Sherman to Eldred Rock. 

It was listed on the National Register of Historic Places in 1975.

The original lens was moved to a museum in Haines, Alaska in 1978.

See also

List of lighthouses in the United States
National Register of Historic Places listings in Haines Borough, Alaska

References

External links
 
  
 Eldred Rock Lighthouse at Lighthouse Friends
 

1906 establishments in Alaska
Lighthouses completed in 1906
Lighthouses on the National Register of Historic Places in Alaska
Buildings and structures on the National Register of Historic Places in Haines Borough, Alaska
Octagonal buildings in the United States